Gustav Eckstein was an American medical doctor, writer, scientist, teacher and philosopher.

Biography
Eckstein was born on 26 October 1890 in Cincinnati, Ohio, USA. Some of his books included 
In Peace Japan Breeds War (1927)
Noguchi (1931) - a biography on Hideyo Noguchi - Japanese-American microbiologist
Lives (1932)
Kettle (1933)
Everyday Miracle (1934)
Hokusai (1935)
Canary (1936)
 Christmas Eve (1938)
Friends of Mine (containing Lives and Canary) (1942)
The Pet Shop (1944) and
The Body Has a Head (1969), a best-seller.

He died in 1981.

In popular culture
The character of Prof. Metz in Kaufman and Hart's 1939 play The Man Who Came to Dinner is based on Eckstein, only with cockroaches in the place of canaries.

In the 1993 film Groundhog Day, Phil Connors, the character played by Bill Murray, is seen reading the book The Body Has a Head.

References

American science writers
1890 births
1981 deaths
American scientists